Amli railway station is a small railway station in Sawai Madhopur district, Rajasthan. Its code is AMLI. It serves Amli village. The station consists of two platforms. The platforms are not well sheltered. It lacks many facilities including water and sanitation. It is connected to some villages – hameerpura, mallapura, shahpura khurd, balapura etc.

Major trains 
 Haldighati Passenger
 Bhopal–Jodhpur Passenger
 Kota–Agra–Yamuna Bridge Passenger
 Mathura–Ratlam Passenger
 Agra Fort–Kota Passenger

References

Railway stations in Sawai Madhopur district
Kota railway division